Mónica Rosa (born 5 May 1978 in Torres Vedras) is a Portuguese runner who specializes in the longer track distances as well as cross-country running and half marathon.

At the 2001 World Championships in Athletics she ran for Portugal in the 5000 metres but did not make the final. She was the 2002 winner of the Cross Internacional de Itálica. She suffered a serious injury in early 2006 and her future as an elite performer seemed in doubt. However, she came back strongly and won the 2007 Oeiras International Cross Country, beating reigning Portuguese champion Jessica Augusto to the finish line. She and Augusto led the Portuguese women to the team bronze medal at the 2007 European Cross Country Championships later that year.

She made her debut over the marathon at the 2010 Paris Marathon and completed the race in a time of 2:37:09. She represented Portugal in the event at the 2010 European Athletics Championships, but did not manage to finish the race. Rosa returned to cross country and won at the Cross de la Constitución in December.

Achievements

Personal bests
1500 metres - 4:15.40 min (2000)
3000 metres - 8:56.58 min (2001)
5000 metres - 15:21.01 min (2001)
10,000 metres - 32:22.25 min (2001)
Half marathon - 1:13:09 hrs (2006)
Marathon - 2:37:09 hrs (2010)

References

External links

The World Cross Country Championships 1973-2005

1978 births
Living people
People from Torres Vedras
Portuguese female long-distance runners
Portuguese female marathon runners
Sportspeople from Lisbon District